Alaudala is a genus of lark in the family Alaudidae. The genus name is a diminutive of Alauda.

Taxonomy and systematics
A molecular phylogenetic study published in 2020 compared the nuclear and mitochondrial DNA from the sand, Asian short-toed, and lesser short-toed larks. The study analysed samples from 130 individuals that represented 16 of the 18 recognised subspecies. The resulting phylogenetic tree indicated that neither the Asian short-toed lark, nor the lesser short-toed lark as currently defined are monophyletic. Most of the subspecies were also found to be non-monophyletic. The authors refrained from proposing a revised taxonomy until additional studies had been completed comparing the vocalizations, sexual behaviour and ecology.

Species
The genus Alaudala contains the following species:

References

 
Bird genera